Spinifex Ridgem mine is an inactive iron ore mine in the Pilbara region of Australia, northeast of Marble Bar.

Overview
Moly Mines awarded production contracts to BGC Contracting in August 2010.

Port facilities at Port Hedland were commissioned in September 2010

The mine had been the subject of a legal dispute during and after the final stages of production. Moly Mines had conducted a mine gate sales agreement with Mineral Resources Limited, under which the latter paid A$35 million in advance for an expected 2.4 million tonnes of iron ore from the mine. Concluded in 2013, the deal was to extend to the completion of mining at Spinifex Ridge, with a final payment in the range of A$3 million due upon this. As part of this agreement, Moly Mines accepted that it could potentially owe money to Mineral Resources, depending on the amount and quality of ore mined. In November 2015, an expert adviser concluded that Moly Mining owned Mineral Resources A$4.2 million, a sum the former disputed. Subsequently, Mineral Resources launched legal action in the Western Australian Supreme Court on 24 December 2015, claiming A$4.9 million. At the time, Moly Mines had A$72.7 million in cash available to invest in another project. The disputed was eventually settled in August 2017 in favour of Moly Mines.

As of 2022, the mine is placed in care and maintenance, having operated from 2010 to 2014, and owned by the former Moly Mines, renamed to Young Australian Mines in 2018.

A separate molybdenum/copper project nearby, also owned by Young Australian Mines, remains undeveloped.

References

External links
 MINEDEX website: Spinifex Ridge - Kitty Gap Iron Database of the Department of Mines, Industry Regulation and Safety
 Spinifex Ridge Molybdenum Project  Environmental Protection Authority of Western Australia

Iron ore mines in Western Australia
Shire of East Pilbara
Surface mines in Australia
2010 establishments in Australia
2014 disestablishments in Australia